Thelkow is a municipality  in the Rostock district, in Mecklenburg-Vorpommern, Germany. The lake Boocksee is found within its borders.

Gallery

References